Wolfgang Heinz may refer to:
Wolfgang Heinz (actor) (1900–1984), Austrian and East German actor and theater director
Wolfgang Heinz (criminologist) (born 1942), German criminologist and writer on jurisprudence
Wolfgang Heinz (politician) (born 1938), German politician of the Free Democratic Party